UKB may stand for:

 IATA airport code of Kobe Airport
 United Keetoowah Band of Cherokee Indians
 United Kingdom of Britain, an erroneous short name for the United Kingdom of Great Britain and Northern Ireland